DNA-binding protein Ikaros also known as Ikaros family zinc finger protein 1 is a protein that in humans is encoded by the IKZF1 gene.

Ikaros - transcription factor 
Ikaros is a transcription factor that is encoded by the IKZF genes of the Ikaros family zinc finger group. Zinc finger is a small structural motif of protein that allows protein binding to DNA or RNA molecule that is characterized by the coordination of one or more zinc ions (Zn2+) in order to stabilize the fold.

Ikaros displays crucial functions in the hematopoietic system and is a known regulator of immune cells development, mainly in early B cells, CD4+ T cells. Its dysfunction has been linked to the development of chronic lymphocytic leukemia. In particular, Ikaros has been found in recent years to be a major tumor suppressor involved in human B-cell acute lymphoblastic leukemia and that it also has a part in the differentiation and function of individual T helper cells.

Ikaros also has a role during the later stages of B cell development during VDJ recombination in switch class of the antibody isotypes and expression of the B cell receptor.

In Ikaros knockout mice, T cells but not B cells are generated late in mouse development due to late compensatory expression of the related gene Aiolos (IKZF3). Ikaros point mutant mice are embryonic lethal due to anemia; they have severe defects in terminal erythrocyte and granulocyte differentiation, and excessive macrophage formation. SNPs located near the 3' region of IKZF1 in humans have been linked to susceptibility to childhood acute lymphoblastic leukemia (ALL) as well as type 1 diabetes. The two effects appear to be in opposite directions, with the allele marking susceptibility to ALL protecting from T1D and vice versa.

Genes of the Ikaros Zinc Finger Family group 
The Ikaros Zinc Finger (IkZF) family of transcription factors are known regulators of hematopoietic cell development and many  immune cells including that of CD4+ T cells. 

The IkZF family consists of five members: Ikaros (encoded by the gene Ikzf1), Helios (Ikzf2), Aiolos (Ikzf3), Eos (Ikzf4), and Pegasus (Ikzf5). These factors contain N-terminal zinc finger (ZF) domains, which are responsible for mediating direct interactions with DNA, and C-terminal ZFs, which facilitate homo- and heterodimerization between IkZF family members. 

IKZF1 is upregulated in granulocytes, B cells, CD4 and CD8 T cells, and NK cells, and downregulated in erythroblasts, megakaryocytes and monocytes.

Ikaros deficiency 
The mutation in the IKZF1 gene can cause dysfunction of the Ikaros transcription factor. The dysfunction affects expression in B cells that can lead to deregulation of the BCR signaling during B cell development and is associated with B cell transformation. The deregulation then can result in low proliferation rate and increased apoptosis of the B cells. The deregulation may be related with lymphoproliferative disorders and different forms of leukemia.

Interactions 

IKZF1 has been shown to interact with:

 CTBP1,
 HDAC1, 
 HDAC7A, 
 Histone deacetylase 5, 
 IKZF2, 
 IKZF3, 
 IKZF4, 
 SIN3A,  
 Cereblon
 SIN3B. 
 GATA2

References

Further reading

External links 
 
 
 

Transcription factors